Jyoti Singh may refer to

 Jyoti Singh (judge), Indian judge
 Jyoti Singh (actress), US-based actress of Indian origin
 Jyoti Singh, victim of the 2012 Delhi gang rape and murder